The Varzob (in the lower reaches also Dushanbinka) is a right tributary of the river Kofarnihon in Tajikistan.

The Varzob rises on the southern flank of the Gissar Mountains, and flows south. It passes through the Varzob District, the town Varzob and through the Tajik capital Dushanbe.

References

Rivers of Tajikistan